"All Cried Out" is a song by English singer-songwriter Alison Moyet, which was released in 1984 as the second single from her debut studio album Alf. It was written by Moyet and producers Jolley & Swain. The song peaked within the top ten on both the Irish and the UK Singles Chart, and also reached the top twenty in Switzerland.

Critical reception
Upon release, Paul Bursche of Number One praised the song as following up "Love Resurrection" with "ease". He commented: "In no way am I the first to rave about this exquisite voice, nor, I suspect, shall I be the last. But I wouldn't let the voice distract me from the song. Alison Moyet not only has a great voice, she's also some songwriter." Jim Reid of Record Mirror commented: "Over a smoothly winding Imagination type backing, Alf offers a perfunctory plea of passion that says more about her vocal coach than her state of mind." Frank Edmonds of the Bury Free Press gave the song an 8 out of 10 rating and described it as "a satisfying follow-up" to "Love Resurrection". He added, "More proof of what an emotive, gutsy singer Alison is. [She] wrings every last drop of feeling, passion and power from the song."

Track listing
7" single
"All Cried Out" – 3:52
"Steal Me Blind" – 3:16

12" single
"All Cried Out" (Extended Version) – 6:53
"Steal Me Blind" – 3:16

12" single
"All Cried Out" (The Re-mix) – 7:57
"Steal Me Blind" – 3:16

Charts

Jamie Watson version

In 1995, Jamie Watson covered the song, whose version musically deviates very much from the original. The cover is musically rather a dance version and is very adapted to the 1990s, so it corresponds to the genre Eurodance. From the accents in the song ago, it corresponds again to the original. Watson's version reached No. 98 on the UK Singles Chart.

Music video 
In the music video, Jamie Watson sings the song while Pantomimes practice depictions in his presence.

Track listing 
CD-Maxi
 "All Cried Out" (Carved In Stone Radio Mix) - 3:46	
 "All Cried Out" (Head 2 Head Extended Mix) - 5:04	
 "It's Alright" - 3:59	
 "All Cried Out" (Carved In Stone Extended Mix) - 5:10

Charts

No Angels version

In 2002, "All Cried Out" was re-recorded in two versions by German pop band No Angels. While a re-worked version with a contemporary pop edge was included on the re-release edition of the group's second album Now... Us! (2002), a re-arranged big band-played version was released on the band's first swing album, When the Angels Swing (2002). Both versions feature different vocals and arrangements, with Sandy Mölling singing main adlibs on the Pop version and Nadja Benaissa on the Big Band version.

Release and reception
Not yet recorded for any other No Angels project, a cover version of Moyet's "All Cried Out" was selected as the band's next single in fall 2002, serving as the lead single of their swing album When the Angels Swing (2002) as well as the Special Winter reissue of their second album Now... Us! (2002). Released by Cheyenne Records in German-speaking Europe on 2 December 2002, the maxi single included both the single versions as well as an Extended Version and When the Angels Swing album cut "Funk Dance," written by Thomas Anders, Christian Geller, and band member Lucy Diakovska, and produced by Mike Turtle, and Tom Jackson.

In Germany, "All Cried Out" debuted and peaked at number 18 on the German Singles Chart, becoming the band's lowest-charting single before their disbandment in 2003. It spent four weeks within the top twenty and fell out of the top 100 after its tenth week. Similarly, the song became the group's lowest-charting entry in Switzerland, where previous single "Let's Go to Bed" had failed to chart. It debuted at number 75 in the week of 22 November 2002, and peaked two weeks later at number 59. In Austria, "All Cried Out" debuted at number 42 on the Ö3 Austria Top 40. It reached its peak, number 23, in its fourth and fifth week on the chart and left the top 75 in its twelfth week.

Music videos

The music video for the Big Band Version of "All Cried Out" was directed by Christopher Häring and produced for DoRo Productions. It was filmed inside the Friedrich von Thiersch concert hall at the Kurhaus Wiesbaden in November 2002. A performance video, it features group shots as well individual shots of the band members on the parquet floor and the balcony of the central pillar-lined hall, wearing the floor-length satin gowns from their When the Angels Swing concert at the Berlin Tränenpalast. The video for the Pop Version was also directed by Häring and features group shots and individual shots of the group during the recording of the song, portraying them inside the recording booth.

Track listing

Credits and personnel
Credits adapted from the liner notes of When the Angels Swing.
Big Band Version

Nadja Benaissa – vocals
 Dirk Decker – vocal recording
Lucy Diakovska – vocals 
 Nik Hafemann – executive producer
 Manfred Honetschläger – arranger, conductor

Sandy Mölling – vocals
 Charly Morell – orchestra engineer
 Perky Park – production – Perky Park, Nik Hafemann
Vanessa Petruo – vocals 
Jessica Wahls – vocals 

Pop Version

 Nadja Benaissa – vocals
 Dirk Decker – vocal recording
 Lucy Diakovska – vocals 
 Nik Hafemann – production, vocal arrangement
 Manfred Honetschläger – arranger, conductor

 Sandy Mölling – vocals
 Perky Park – production, mixing, recording
 Vanessa Petruo – vocals 
 Jessica Wahls – vocals

Charts

References

External links
 
 
 

1984 songs
1984 singles
1995 singles
2002 singles
Alison Moyet songs
No Angels songs
Pop ballads
Torch songs
Songs written by Alison Moyet
Songs written by Tony Swain (musician)
Songs written by Steve Jolley (songwriter)
Song recordings produced by Jolley & Swain
Columbia Records singles